Dimitrie D. Pătrășcanu (October 8, 1872–November 4, 1937) was a Romanian prose writer and dramatist.

Born in Tomești, Iași County, his parents were Dimitrie Pătrășcanu, a farmer, and his wife Maria (née Vicol). He attended primary school in his native village and in Iași, followed by the National College in the latter city. In 1893, he entered the literature and philosophy faculty of the University of Iași, as well as the higher normal school. After graduating, he taught history at Focșani, Bacău, and Bucharest. He authored numerous textbooks, a pursuit to which he dedicated himself entirely in his last years. A member of the National Liberal Party, he was elected to the Assembly of Deputies on a number of occasions.

He made his published debut with an article in the Bacău gazette Crainicul. He formed part of the circle surrounding Viața Românească, to which he began contributing in June 1906, with an article on folk tales. The co-director of Viața Românească'''s publishing house and bookstore, he played a key role in the magazine's relaunch in 1920, following World War I. He also wrote for Luceafărul, Flacăra, Lumina and Adevărul literar și artistic. His humorous prose (Schițe și amintiri, 1909; Ce cere publicul de la un deputat și alte schițe, 1912; Timothei mucenicul, 1913; Candidat fără noroc și alte povestiri folositoare, 1916; Înzăpădiți!, 1916; Domnul Nae – Scene din vremea ocupației, 1921; Decorația lui Vartolomei, 1924; Un prânz de gală, 1928) largely revolves around situational comedy, with buffoon-type effects. Timothei mucenicul'' earned him the Romanian Academy's prize. Pătrășcanu died in Bucharest.

His son was Lucrețiu Pătrășcanu.

Notes

1872 births
1937 deaths
People from Iași County
Alexandru Ioan Cuza University alumni
Romanian male short story writers
Romanian short story writers
Romanian schoolteachers
Romanian humorists
Romanian textbook writers
Romanian publishers (people)
National Liberal Party (Romania) politicians
Members of the Chamber of Deputies (Romania)